Lynchburg-Clay High School is a public high school in Lynchburg, Ohio.  It is the only high school in the Lynchburg-Clay Local School District.

Athletics
The school mascot is the Mustang. They offer baseball, basketball, bowling, softball, soccer, track and field, volleyball, golf and cross country. They are a member of the Ohio High School Athletic Association and the Southern Hills Athletic League.

Notable alumni
 Gary Abernathy newspaper editor, Republican party official, and nationally syndicated political columnist
 Rob Preston professional basketball player

References

External links
 District Website

High schools in Highland County, Ohio
Public high schools in Ohio